describes an individual who is either the child of one Japanese and one non-Japanese parent or, less commonly, two half Japanese parents. Because the term is specific to individuals of ethnic Japanese (Yamato) ancestry, individuals whose Japanese ancestry is not of ethnic Japanese origin, such as Zainichi Koreans (e.g. Crystal Kay Williams and Kiko Mizuhara) will not be listed. This list is only for Hāfu in popular culture.

Fictional characters

American Animation
 Edna Mode
 Buckaroo Banzai
 Reagan Ridley

American Comics
 Daken
 Hiro Hamada

Japan Anime/Manga
 Sylia Stingray (Japanese-British)
 Priscilla Asagiri (Japanese-American)
 Nene Romanova (Japanese-Russian)
 Ryo Asuka
 Lan Asuka
 L Lawliet (25% Japanese)
 Mikasa Ackerman
 Eli Ayase (25% Russian)
 Erika Campbell
 Ira Gamagoori
 Hayato Gokudera
 Langa Hasegawa (Canadian father)
 Shuichi Akai
 Isami Aldini (Italian mother)
 Takumi Aldini (Italian mother)
 Jolyne Cujoh (Italian-American mother) (25% Japanese) 
 Giorno Giovanna (British father)
 Ai Haibara (British mother)
 Shukichi Haneda
 Josuke Higashikata (British father)
 Taichi Hiraga-Keaton
 Cygnus Hyōga (Russian mother)
 Kid Kaiju
 Urara Kasugano
 Sentarō Kawabuchi
 Jotaro Kujo (British-Italian mother)
 Arsene Lupin III (French grandfather)
 Clarissa Satsuki Maezono
 Peggy Matsuyama (Swiss father)
 Louie Nishiwaki
 Mari Ohara (Italian-American father)
 Rin Okumura
 Lev Haiba
 Elena Amamiya (Mexican Father)
 Lucyna "Lucy" Kushinada (Polish parent)

Japanese Drama
 Vito Hayakawa

Video Games
 Anastasia (Russian father)
 Kazuhira Miller (American Father)
 Jetstream Sam
 Frederica Miyamoto (Italian father)
 Rebecca Miyamoto (American mother)

Unorganized
 Suoh Pavlichenko
 Mukuro Rokudo
 Yasutora Sado (unspecified parent of Mexican descent)
 Claudine Saijō (French mother)
 Tsuna Sawada
 Eriri Spencer Sawamura
 Masumi Sera
 Layla "Reira" Serizawa
 Asuka Langley Soryu (25% Japanese)
 Kallen Stadtfeld
 Tamaki Suoh (French mother)
 Pegasus Tenma
 Ann Takamaki
 Takumi Usui (25% British)
 Eve Wakamiya
 Ryo Watanabe
 Chris Yukine
 Setsuka (Portuguese mother)
 Tōta Konoe (English grandfather)
 Yuta Sakurai (Half-British)
 Chrome
 Jack Hanma
 Mikaela Hyakuya
 Elena Shimabara
 Meguru Hachimiya

See Also

References

Japanese people
Hāfu